Dakarai is a given name. Notable people with the name include:

Dakarai Allen (born 1995), American basketball player
Dakarai Gwitira,  Zimbabwe-born music producer

See also
Dakari